The following is a timeline of the history of the city of Dortmund, Germany.

Prior to 19th century

 1005 - Henry II, Holy Roman Emperor holds an "ecclesiastical council" in Dortmund.
 1016 - Henry II, Holy Roman Emperor holds an "Imperial diet" in Dortmund.
 1215 -  consecrated.
 1220 - Dortmund becomes an imperial city of the Holy Roman Empire.
 1240 -  in use (approximate date).
 1267 - St. Mary's Church first mentioned.
 1270 - St. Reinold's Church built.
 1293 - Brewing right granted.
 1322 -  (church) construction begins.
 1332 - City rights confirmed per "Privilegium Ludovicum."
 1388 - Dortmunder Bürgerschützenverein (militia) formed.
 1400 - Vehmic court established (approximate date).
 1454 - Tower built on St. Reinold's Church.
 1521 - "" altarpiece installed in the Petrikirche.
 1523 - Protestant Reformation.
 1543 -  (school) founded.
 1546 - Tower for the  added to Town Hall.
 1570 - Dortmund adopts Lutheranism per the "Augsburg Confession".
 1609 - Jülich-Cleves-related  signed in Dortmund.

19th century
 1803 - Dormund "annexed to Nassau."
 1806 - French in power.
 1808 - Dormund becomes capital of French satellite Ruhr (department).
 1815
 Dortmund becomes part of Prussia per Congress of Vienna.
  (regional mining office) headquartered in city.
 1816 - Population: 4,465.
 1841 -  (bank) founded.
 1847 - Duisburg–Dortmund railway and Dortmund–Hamm railway begin operating.
 1849 - Elberfeld–Dortmund railway begins operating.
 1855 - Dortmund–Soest railway begins operating.
 1861
  (shooting-sport club) formed.
 Population: 23,348.
 1863 -  dismantled.
 1871
 Hoesch AG steel company in business.
 Westfalenhütte industrial area developed.
 1872 -  (historical society) founded.
 1875 
 Dortmund–Enschede railway in operation.
 Population:57,742.
 1878 - Ernst Heinrich Lindemann becomes mayor.
 1880 -  in use (approximate date).
 1883 - Museum of Art and Cultural History founded.
 1885 - Population: 78,435.
 1887 - Dortmund Philharmonic orchestra formed.
 1890
 Royal School of Machine Building established.
 Population: 89,663.
 1895
  Dortmund (regional postal administration) established.
 Post office built.
 Population: 111,232.
 1897 - City electric power system begins operating.
 1899
 Dortmund–Ems Canal and Dortmund Port open.
 City Hall restored.
  founded.
 1900
 Regional  (Chamber of Skilled Crafts) headquartered in city.
 Synagogue built.

20th century

1900s-1945
 1901 -  established.
 1904
 Theater Dortmund and trade school founded.
  (tower) built.
 1905 - Population: 175,577.
 1909
 Borussia Dortmund sport club formed.
 Nordmarkt area laid out.
 1910
 Dortmund Hauptbahnhof built.
 Population: 214,226.
 1914 - Eving becomes part of city.
 1919 - Population: 295,026.
 1920
 Regional  municipal association created.
 Population: 313,752.
 1924 - Weisse Wiese stadium opens.
 1926 - Botanischer Garten Rombergpark acquired by city.
 1927 - Dortmund U-Tower built.
 1928
  becomes part of city.
 Population: 465,196.
 1929 -  and Syburg become part of city.
 1933 -  mining company in business.
 1938 - Dortberghaus built.
 1939 - Nazi camp for Sinti and Romani people established (see also Porajmos).
 1943
 May: SS construction brigade (forced labour camp) established by the SS. 
 September: SS construction brigade presumably dissolved.
 1944 - Subcamp of the Buchenwald concentration camp established for 400 Polish women who survived the Warsaw Uprising (see also Nazi crimes against the Polish nation).
 1945
 March: Women's subcamp of Buchenwald dissolved. Prisoners deported to the Bergen-Belsen concentration camp.
 13 April: Allied forces take city.

1946-1990s
 1946
 Fritz Henßler becomes mayor.
  newspaper begins publication.
 1947
 29 March: Miners strike against food shortage.
 Museum Ostwall opens.
 1950 - Population: 507,349.
 1952 - Westfalenhallen rebuilt.
 1953 - Dortmund Zoo established.
 1955 - City co-hosts the 1955 Ice Hockey World Championships.
 1956 - Population: 607,885.
 1959
 Florianturm (TV tower) erected.
 National Bundesgartenschau (garden show) held in the Westfalenpark.
 City hosts the 1959 World Table Tennis Championships.
 1960 - Dortmund Airport opens.
 1961 -  built.
 1963 - Dortmund Stadthaus station opens.
 1964 - City hosts the 1964 World Figure Skating Championships.
 1968 - University of Dortmund established.
 1969 -  hi-rise built.
 1973
 Dortmund Sparkassen Chess Meeting begins.
  becomes mayor.
 1974 - Westfalenstadion (stadium) opens.
 1975 - City co-hosts the 1975 Ice Hockey World Championships.
 1976 -  established.
 1977 - Eving Selimiye Camii (mosque) established.
 1978 -  built.
 1980 - City hosts the 1980 World Figure Skating Championships.
 1983
 Dortmund University station opens.
  (insurance entity) active.
 1984 - Dortmund Stadtbahn begins operating.
 1985
  opens.
  (casino) built.
 1987 - Coalmining pit closes, "marking the end of more than 150 years of coalmining in Dortmund."
 1991 - Steel company Hoesch AG was bought by Krupp.
 1992 -  (tower) reconstructed.
 1993 -  museum established.
 1999
  becomes mayor.
  (trade school) active.

21st century

 2005
  built.
  opens.
 2006 - June: Some of the 2006 FIFA World Cup soccer contest held in Dortmund.
 2008 - Love Parade held in city.
 2014
 Ullrich Sierau becomes mayor.
 Population: 580,511.

See also
 Dortmund history
 
 
 :de:Zahlen und Fakten zur Politik in Dortmund (in German) includes list of mayors
 Timelines of other cities in the state of North Rhine-Westphalia:(de) Aachen, Bonn, Cologne, Duisburg, Düsseldorf, Essen, Münster

References

This article incorporates information from the German Wikipedia.

Bibliography

in English
 
 
 
  (about Bochum, Dortmund, and Essen)

in German
published in the 19th c.
 
  ongoing
 
 
  
 
 
 
 

published in the 20th-21st c.
 
 
 G. Luntowski and N. Reimann, ed., Dortmund 1100 Jahre Stadtgeschichte, (Dortmund, 1982)
 Gustav Luntowski et al. Geschichte der Stadt Dortmund. Harenberg, Dortmund 1994,

External links

 Europeana. Items related to Dortmund, various dates.
 Digital Public Library of America. Items related to Dortmund, various dates

Dortmund
dortmund
Years in Germany
Dortmund
Dortmund